The Ministry of Environment and Climate Change (abbreviated MMA) is a cabinet-level federal ministry in Brazil. The ministry emerged from the Special Secretariat for the Environment within the now-extinct Ministry of the Interior from 1974 to 1985. It has gone through several name changes since its inception.

Responsibilities

 National Environmental Policy
 Environmental policies and programs for the Amazon and other Brazilian biomes
 Water resources policy
 National water security policy
 Policies for the preservation, conservation and sustainable use of ecosystems, biodiversity and forests
 Policies for integrating environmental protection with economic production
 Regulatory and economic strategies, mechanisms and instruments for improving environmental quality and the sustainable use of natural resources
 National policy on climate change
 Ecological-economic zoning and other territorial planning instruments, including marine spatial planning, in articulation with other competent Ministries
 Management of public forests for sustainable production
 Management of the Rural Environmental Registry (CAR) at the federal level
 Policies for the integration between environmental policy and energy policy
 Policies for the protection and recovery of native vegetation
 Environmental quality of human settlements, in conjunction with the Ministry of Cities
 National environmental education policy, in conjunction with the Ministry of Education
 Shared management of fisheries resources, in conjunction with the Ministry of Fisheries and Aquaculture

Structure

Councils 

 National Council for the Environment (CONAMA)  ;
 National Water Resources Council (CNRH)  ;
 Genetic Heritage Management Council (CGen)  ;
 National Council for the Legal Amazon (CONAMAZ)  ;
 National Rubber Council (CNB)  ;
 National Commission to Combat Desertification (CNCD)  ;
 Steering Committee of the National Fund on Climate Change  ;
 Deliberative Council of the National Environment Fund

Linked Entities 

 Brazilian Institute of Environment and Renewable Natural Resources (IBAMA)
 Chico Mendes Institute for Biodiversity Conservation (ICMBio)
 Rio de Janeiro Botanical Garden
 National Water Agency

List of Environmental Ministers

 Paulo Nogueira Neto (1974-1985, as Special Secretariat for the Environment (Ministry of the Interior))
 Flavio Rios Peixoto da Silveira (1985-1986, as Ministry of Urban Development and Environment)
 Deni Lineu Schwartz (1986-1987)
 Prisco Viana (1987-1988, Ministry of Housing, Urbanism and Environment)
 Fernando Coutinho Jorge (1992-1993, as Ministry of the Environment)
 Rubens Ricupero (1993-1994, as Ministry of the Environment and the Legal Amazon)
 Henrique Brandão Cavalcanti (1994-1995, interim)
 Gustavo Krause (1995-1999, Ministry of the Environment, Water Resources and the Legal Amazon)
 Sarney Filho (1999-2002, as Ministry of the Environment)
 Jose Carlos Carvalho (2002-2003)
 Marina Silva (2003)
 Cláudio Roberto Bertoldo Langone (interim, 2003) 
 Marina Silva (2003-2008)
 Carlos Minc (2008-2010)
 Izabella Teixeira (2010-2016)
 Sarney Filho (2016-2018)
 Edson Duarte (interim, 2018-2019) 
 Ricardo Salles (2019-2021)
 Joaquim Alvaro Pereira Leite (2021-2022)
 Marina Silva (2023-, as Ministry of the Environment and Climate Change)

See also
 Environment of Brazil
 Environmental governance in Brazil
 List of environmental ministries

References

External links
 Official site 

Brazil
Environment
Environmental agencies in Brazil